Noah Sife is an actor based out of Los Angeles, CA. His TV credits include The Shield, and a brief Improv Show on MTV starring Andy Dick. He is also the star of the internet show entitled The Adventures of Noah Sife, His YouTube videos have attracted a sum of over 1,000,000 views. He has released a  DVD titled The Adventures of Noah Sife V. 1 and is currently working on the feature film The Adventures of Noah Sife V. 2 . Noah is also a writer and has written the "Adventures of Noah Sife" series so far. 
He is also the creator of AONS (Adventures of Noah Sife) Productions, which is an up-and-coming production company. He is currently working on more videos for the series.

References

Living people
1984 births
American male television actors